Jairo Fernando "El Tigre" (The Tiger) Castillo Cortés (born 17 November 1977) is a retired Colombian football player. He has played for a number of clubs in Colombia, Argentina, Spain, Cyprus and Uruguay.

Club career
Castillo started his playing career in 1994 at América de Cali, where he won the league title in 1997.

In 2000, he joined Vélez Sársfield of Argentina but returned to América de Cali after only one season where he won in 2002, another Colombian league title. In 2003, he went back to Argentina to play for Club Atlético Independiente.

He then had spells in Europe with Real Valladolid of Spain and AEL Limassol of Cyprus, In 2008, he joined Defensor Sporting of Uruguay.

Castillo returned to Argentina in 2008 to play for newly promoted Godoy Cruz, he scored twice on his league debut against Banfield and then on 28 September 2008 he scored a hat-trick helping Godoy Cruz to beat Boca Juniors 4–1.

Ironically, his improved form would only cause more heartbreak; being Godoy Cruz best player, he would yet again have an injury putting a major dent into his career. The next game, on 5 October 2008, away to Gimnasia, Jairo suffered a season-ending torn ACL after a hard tackle. Godoy Cruz subsequently lost their next 3 games.

In September 2009, after 11 months without playtime, Jairo Castillo left Godoy Cruz after his contract with the club from Mendoza expired, and joined the ranks of Millonarios, in Bogotá, Colombia. In December 2009 the 32-year-old forward Jairo Fernando Castillo Cortés moved back to Godoy Cruz after six months in Colombia.

International career
Castillo played 23 times for the Colombia national team between 1999 and 2005, he was part of the squad that won their first and only Copa América title in 2001.

References

External links
 Argentine Primera statistics at Fútbol XXI  
 Official Club Player Profile  
 Spanish Segunda statistics
 

1977 births
Living people
Association football forwards
Colombian footballers
Colombian expatriate footballers
Colombia international footballers
América de Cali footballers
Atlético Bucaramanga footballers
Club Atlético Vélez Sarsfield footballers
Club Atlético Independiente footballers
Real Valladolid players
Millonarios F.C. players
AEL Limassol players
Defensor Sporting players
Godoy Cruz Antonio Tomba footballers
Querétaro F.C. footballers
Atlético Tucumán footballers
Boyacá Chicó F.C. footballers
Expatriate footballers in Argentina
Expatriate footballers in Uruguay
Expatriate footballers in Mexico
Expatriate footballers in Cyprus
Expatriate footballers in Spain
Categoría Primera A players
Categoría Primera B players
Argentine Primera División players
La Liga players
Cypriot First Division players
Uruguayan Primera División players
2000 CONCACAF Gold Cup players
2001 Copa América players
Copa América-winning players
People from Tumaco
Sportspeople from Nariño Department